Huang Zhikun (February 1925 – 29 June 2017), better known by his pen name Ai Mingzhi, was a Chinese author and screenwriter who wrote many screenplays beginning in the 1950s. During the Cultural Revolution (1966–1976) he suffered persecution with all of his works banned, but he returned to writing in 1978.

Works translated into English
Seeds of Flame, partially translated into English by Sidney Shapiro and Ho Yu-chih, was serialized in the April 1964 & May 1964 issues of Chinese Literature.

Filmography

References

艾明之
怀念恩师艾明之：成长于苦难之中，散发出文学的光芒

External links

1925 births
2017 deaths
Screenwriters from Shanghai
20th-century Chinese writers
Chinese male novelists
20th-century Chinese male writers
People of the Republic of China
Victims of the Cultural Revolution